Juan Chandía (1892–1964) was a Chilean politician. During the presidency of Gabriel Gonzalez Videla, Chandía served as the governor of Tomé for the period 1946–1952.

1892 births
1964 deaths
Chilean politicians